Rheinisches Landestheater Neuss  is a theatre in Neuss, North Rhine-Westphalia, Germany.

Theatres in North Rhine-Westphalia